Bandwagonesque is the third album by Scottish alternative rock band Teenage Fanclub, released in November 1991 on Creation Records. The album gave the band substantial US success when the single "Star Sign" reached number four on the Billboard Modern Rock Tracks chart, becoming their biggest hit in that country, with "What You Do to Me" and "The Concept" also becoming top 20 hits on that chart. Bandwagonesque was voted 'album of the year' for 1991 by American music magazine Spin, famously beating Nirvana's landmark album Nevermind. It was voted number 386 in Colin Larkin's All Time Top 1000 Albums 3rd Edition (2000).

Background and recording
Teenage Fanclub released their debut album, A Catholic Education, in 1990 on small independent label Paperhouse, and followed it up with the God Knows It's True EP before signing with Creation Records. 

Following an encounter with Don Fleming at CBGB in New York City in March 1991, Teenage Fanclub started recording at Amazon Studios in Liverpool, with Fleming as producer. Fleming encouraged the band to work on adding vocal harmonies, noting that not many of their contemporaries were doing so.

The album's release was preceded by The King, an album of covers and outtakes recorded using leftover studio time from the Bandwagonesque sessions.

Reception

The liner notes to the 2009 Big Star box set Keep an Eye on the Sky said that Bandwagonesque was "... an album so in thrall to Chilton, Bell, and company that some critics had taken to calling it "Big Star's 4th."

Legacy
In 2006 the album was performed live in its entirety as part of the All Tomorrow's Parties-curated Don't Look Back series. In 2013, NME ranked it at number 115 in its list of the 500 Greatest Albums of All Time.

"The Concept" was also featured prominently in the 2011 film Young Adult.  "What You Do To Me" was featured in the 2013 film The World's End and on its soundtrack album.

On July 28, 2017, Benjamin Gibbard of Death Cab for Cutie released Bandwagonesque, an album covering all twelve tracks of the original 1991 release. He noted that it was "[his] favorite record by [his] favorite band of all time."

Cover art

The cover is designed by Sharon Fitzgerald. When Kiss member Gene Simmons, who had trademarked the logo of a moneybag with dollar symbol, was made aware of the record he sent a letter to Geffen Records, who in turn gave in and sent Simmons a cheque, according to Simmons's book Sex Money Kiss.

Track listing

Personnel
Teenage Fanclub

Norman Blake – vocals, guitar, bass on "Is This Music?"
Gerard Love – vocals, bass, guitar on "Is This Music?"
Raymond McGinley – guitar, vocals on "I Don't Know"
Brendan O'Hare – drums, vocals on "Sidewinder"

Additional musicians
Joseph McAlinden – brass and strings
Don Fleming – occasional guitar and vocals
Dave Buchanan – handclaps

Technical

Don Fleming – production
Teenage Fanclub – production, arrangements
Paul Chisholm – production, engineering
Keith Hartley – engineer
Dave Buchanan – assistant engineering
George Peckham – mastering
Sharon Fitzgerald – cover design, photography

References

Teenage Fanclub albums
1991 albums
Albums produced by Don Fleming (musician)
Creation Records albums